Karen Chance is an American novelist. She grew up in Orlando, Florida. She has lived in France, Great Britain, Hong Kong and New Orleans, where she has taught history. She is currently living in Florida. She has been a full time author since 2008.

Chance has had books on the New York Times and USAToday bestselling lists.

Chance's Cassandra Palmer series follows ghost whisperer/clairvoyant Cassie Palmer, as she learns what it is to be the Pythia, the chief seer of the supernatural world. As the series progresses, she explores her identity, her powers, and the supernatural community and her place in it.

The Midnight's Daughter series spin off from the Cassandra Palmer series. The main character, Dorina Basarab, is the dhampir (half human, half vampire) daughter of Mircea Basarab , one of the Pythia's supporters in the vampire community and a love interest for Cassandra. There are a few characters who appear in both series.

Bibliography

The Cassandra Palmer series 

Touch the Dark, June 2006, 
Claimed by Shadow, April 2007, 
Embrace the Night, April 2008, 
Curse the Dawn, April 2009, 
Hunt the Moon, June 2011, 
Tempt the Stars, October 2013, 
Reap the Wind, November 2015, 
Ride the Storm, August 2017, 
Brave the Tempest, July 2019, 
Shatter the Earth, February 2020 
Ignite the Fire: Incendiary, September 2021 
Ignite the Fire: Inferno, January 2022

Short Stories/Novellas/Side Character Novels 

The Mammoth Book of Vampire Romance, July 2008, .
The Day of the Dead
Features Tomas, from the Cassandra Palmer series.
The Mammoth Book of Paranormal Romance 2, October 2010, .
The Gauntlet
Features Kit Marlowe, from the Cassandra Palmer series. Prequel to "the Queen's Witch".
The Queen's Witch, May 2010, . 
Features Kit Marlowe.
A Family Affair, August 2011, . 
Features John Pritkin, from the Cassandra Palmer series.
Shadowland, November 2012, . 
Features John Pritkin, from the Cassandra Palmer series.
The House at Cobb End, November 2012, . 
Features John Pritkin, from the Cassandra Palmer series.
Masks, March 2014,  
a Mircea Basarab novel, prequel to the Cassandra Palmer series
Siren's Song, July, 2019, .
A John Pritkin novel, from the Cassandra Palmer series.
Junk Magic, October, 2022, .
A Lia de Croisset novel, Cassandra Palmer universe.

Dorina Basarab series 

Midnight's Daughter, October 2008, 
Death's Mistress, January 2010, 
Fury's Kiss, October 2012, 
Shadow's Bane, July 2018, 
Queen's Gambit, May 2020,

Short Stories/Novellas

Buying Trouble and also in On the Prowl, August 2007, .
Buying Trouble
Features Claire Lachesis, from the Dorina Basarab series.
Wolfsbane and Mistletoe, October 2008, .
Rogue Elements
Features Lia De Croissets, the war mage.
Strange Brew, July 2009, . 
Vegas Odds
Features Lia De Croissets.
Inked, 2010, .
Skin Deep
Features Lia De Croissets.
Chicks Kick Butt, July 2011, . 
In Vino Veritas
Features Dorina Basarab, shortly after Death's Mistress.
Zombie's Bite, December 2015, ASIN: B018WS0CN6. 
Features Dorina Basarab and Kit Marlowe, from the Midnight's Daughter series.
Lover's Knot, June 2017, ASIN: B073G9QLMD. 
Features Dorina Basarab and Kit Marlowe, from the Midnight's Daughter series.
Dragon's Claw, September 2018, ASIN: B07H2B9NDB. 
Features Dorina Basarab from the Midnight's Daughter series.

References

External links
 Karen Chance official site

Literary Escapism interviews Karen Chance 

21st-century American novelists
American fantasy writers
American women short story writers
American women novelists
Living people
Year of birth missing (living people)
Urban fantasy writers
Women science fiction and fantasy writers
21st-century American women writers
21st-century American short story writers,